Antonio García Márquez (born 1 July 1989) is a Spanish footballer who plays for Vélez CF as a midfielder.

Club career
Born in Málaga, García Márquez started playing as a senior with Real Murcia's B-team, also being loaned to amateur clubs during his stint. After one full season with the club he returned to his native Andalusia and signed with UD Almería, playing initially for the reserves in the third division; on 30 September 2011 he was selected for the match against Recreativo de Huelva and, the following day, played his first and only game as a professional, which consisted of one minute in a 1–0 away win in the second level championship after he came on as a substitute for Rafita.

In the 2012 summer, García was released by Almería and returned to Murcia B, being released a year later. On 17 June 2014 he moved to Vélez CF also in the fourth level.

References

External links
 
 
 

1989 births
Living people
Footballers from Málaga
Spanish footballers
Association football midfielders
Segunda División players
Segunda División B players
Tercera División players
Real Murcia players
UD Almería B players
UD Almería players